Pikhtinskaya is a rural locality (a village) in Azletskoye Rural Settlement, Kharovsky District, Vologda Oblast, Russia. The population was 18 as of 2002.

Geography 
Pikhtinskaya is located 47 km northwest of Kharovsk (the district's administrative centre) by road. Gorka Kizimskaya is the nearest rural locality.

References 

Rural localities in Kharovsky District